Porphyrosela homotropha is a moth of the family Gracillariidae. It is known from Ethiopia.

The length of the forewings is 1.45 mm. Adults are on wing from November to January.

The larvae feed on Glycine max and Vigna species. They mine the leaves of their host plant.

References

Endemic fauna of Ethiopia
Moths described in 1963
Lithocolletinae
Insects of Ethiopia
Moths of Africa